Zhao Jin may refer to:

 Zhao Jin (linguist), Chinese linguist
 Zhao Jin (swimmer), Chinese swimmer

See also
 Zhao Jing (disambiguation)